Henry John D'Amore (July 17, 1919 – May 12, 1994) was a Canadian ice hockey centre. Born in Niagara Falls, Ontario, he played in the National Hockey League for the New York Rangers. Hank was the brother of the NHL hockey player Nick Damore.

External links

1919 births
1994 deaths
Canadian ice hockey centres
Sportspeople from Niagara Falls, Ontario
New Haven Eagles players
New York Rangers players
New York Rovers players
Washington Lions players
Ice hockey people from Ontario
Canadian expatriate ice hockey players in the United States